The Murinsel (German, literally Mur island) in Graz, Austria, is an artificial floating "island" in the middle of the Mur river and links the two banks on both sides. At night the blue navigation lights that surround the structure light up. This landmark of Graz was designed by New York City artist Vito Acconci on the occasion of Graz becoming the 2003 European Capital of Culture.

Described by the artist as "A bowl that morphs into a dome that morphs into a bowl…" Mur Island is in the form of a giant sea shell and measures  in length. Two footbridges connect it with both banks of the Mur. The center of the platform forms an amphitheatre. Below a twisted round dome there is a café and a playground.

References

External links 

Murinsel web site
Murinsel page on Graz Tourism web site

Buildings and structures in Graz
Tourist attractions in Graz
Mur (river)
Bridges over the Mura
Bridges completed in 2003